Johnson–McMillin syndrome, also known as Johnson neuroectodermal syndrome, is a neuroectodermal syndrome characterized by conductive hearing loss and alopecia, microtia, conductive hearing loss, anosmia/hyposmia, and hypogonadotropic hypogonadism.

See also
 List of cutaneous conditions

References

External links 

Genodermatoses
Genetic disorders with OMIM but no gene
Syndromes affecting hearing
Rare genetic syndromes